Prohens is a surname from the island of Mallorca, Spain. Notable people with the surname include:

James Prohens (1911–2007), Spanish priest and poet
Marga Prohens (born 1982), Spanish politician

Surnames of Spanish origin